Ko Kyung-joon  (born March 7, 1987) is a South Korean football player who plays for Stallion Laguna in the Philippines Football League.

He formerly played for Suwon Samsung Bluewings, Chunnam Dragons, Gyeongnam FC, Yesan FC, Tokyo Verdy, and Seoul E-Land.

Career
In 2006, Ko played three games for Suwon Samsung Bluewings in the K League, and scored one goal in six league cup appearances.

Stallion Laguna
In August 2017, he joined Philippines Football League club Stallion Laguna. On August 12, 2017, he made his debut on a 2–3 home defeat against Meralco Manila, he scored his first goal for the club as well.

References

External links
 Ko Kyung-joon at HKFA
 

 

1987 births
Living people
Sportspeople from Jeju Province
Association football defenders
South Korean footballers
South Korean expatriate footballers
Suwon Samsung Bluewings players
Jeonnam Dragons players
Gyeongnam FC players
Ulsan Hyundai Mipo Dockyard FC players
South China AA players
J2 League players
Tokyo Verdy players
Seoul E-Land FC players
Hwaseong FC players
K League 1 players
K League 2 players
Korea National League players
K3 League players
Hong Kong First Division League players
Expatriate footballers in Hong Kong
South Korean expatriate sportspeople in Hong Kong
Expatriate footballers in Japan
South Korean expatriate sportspeople in Japan
Expatriate footballers in the Philippines
South Korean expatriate sportspeople in the Philippines